Ernst-Robert-Curtius-Preis was a German literary prize, named after the literary scholar Ernst Robert Curtius. It was founded in 1984, and recognizes outstanding essay writers. The prize was awarded until 2015 at the Rheinische Friedrich-Wilhelms-Universität in Bonn and endowed with €8,000 (Förderpreis: €4,000).

Recipients
FP: Förderpreis

 1984: Golo Mann
 1985: Kurt Sontheimer
 1986: Hilde Spiel, FP: Ulrich Holbein and Thomas Lautwein
 1987: Wolf Jobst Siedler, FP: Uwe Schmitt
 1988: François Bondy, FP: Walter van Rossum
 1989: Friedrich Dürrenmatt, FP: Jens Jessen
 1990: Hermann Lübbe, FP: Verena Lenzen
 1991: Günter Kunert, FP: Norbert Hinterberger
 1992: Werner Ross, FP: Jörg Lau
 1993: Peter Sloterdijk, FP: Joachim Vogel
 1994: Karl Dietrich Bracher, FP: Thomas Hettche
 1995: Hubert Markl, FP: Michael Maar
 1996: Odo Marquard, FP: Helmut Böttiger
 1997: Hans Magnus Enzensberger, FP: Doron Rabinovici
 1998: Rüdiger Safranski, FP: Franziska Augstein
 1999: Hans-Peter Schwarz, FP: Florian Illies
 2000: Günter de Bruyn, FP: Ulf Poschardt
 2001: Hans Küng, FP: Christiane Florin
 2003: Brigitte Hamann, FP: Adriano Sack
 2005: Dieter Wellershoff, FP: Thomas Speckmann
 2007: Silvia Bovenschen, FP: Felicitas von Lovenberg
 2009: Richard Schröder, FP: Raoul Löbbert
 2011: Aleida Assmann, FP: Timo Frasch
 2013: Ulrich Raulff, FP: Adam Soboczynski
 2015: , FP: Philipp Felsch

References

Further reading
 

German literary awards
Awards established in 1984
1984 establishments in Germany